Aviz Rural District is a rural district (dehestan) in the Central District of Farashband County, Fars Province, Iran. At the 2006 census, its population was 6,836, in 1,451 families.  The rural district has 29 villages.

References 

Rural Districts of Fars Province
Farashband County